In mathematics, a sequence transformation is an operator acting on a given space of sequences (a sequence space). Sequence transformations include linear mappings such as convolution with another sequence, and resummation of a sequence and, more generally, are commonly used for series acceleration, that is, for improving the rate of convergence of a slowly convergent sequence or series. Sequence transformations are also commonly used to compute the  antilimit of a divergent series numerically, and are used in conjunction with extrapolation methods.

Overview
Classical examples for sequence transformations include the binomial transform, Möbius transform, Stirling transform and others.

Definitions
For a given sequence 

the transformed sequence is 

where the members of the transformed sequence are usually computed from some finite number of members of the original sequence, i.e.

Binomial transform). More generally, they may be elements of some vector space or algebra. 

In the context of acceleration of convergence, the transformed sequence is said to converge faster than the original sequence if 

  

In this case, convergence acceleration is obtained. If the original sequence is divergent, the sequence transformation acts as extrapolation method to the antilimit .

If the mapping  is linear in each of its arguments, i.e., for

 

for some constants  (which may depend on n), the sequence transformation   is called a linear sequence transformation. Sequence transformations that are not linear are called nonlinear sequence transformations.

Examples
Simplest examples of (linear) sequence transformations include shifting all elements,  (resp. = 0 if n + k < 0) for a fixed k, and scalar multiplication of the sequence.

A less trivial example would be the discrete convolution with a fixed sequence. A particularly basic form is the difference operator, which is convolution with the sequence  and is a discrete analog of the derivative. The binomial transform is another linear transformation of a still more general type.

An example of a nonlinear sequence transformation is Aitken's delta-squared process, used to improve the rate of convergence of a slowly convergent sequence. An extended form of this is the Shanks transformation. The Möbius transform is also a nonlinear transformation, only possible for integer sequences.

See also 
 Aitken's delta-squared process
 Minimum polynomial extrapolation
 Richardson extrapolation
 Series acceleration
 Steffensen's method

References

Hugh J. Hamilton, "Mertens' Theorem and Sequence Transformations", AMS (1947)

External links
 Transformations of Integer Sequences, a subpage of the On-Line Encyclopedia of Integer Sequences

Mathematical series
Asymptotic analysis
Perturbation theory